Chapel Lane railway station was a station to the north of Melverley, Shropshire, England. The station was opened in 1920 and closed in 1933.

References

Further reading

Disused railway stations in Shropshire
Railway stations in Great Britain opened in 1920
Railway stations in Great Britain closed in 1933